Powiat bielski may refer to either of two counties (powiats) in Poland:
Bielsk County, in Podlaskie Voivodeship (north-east Poland)
Bielsko County, in Silesian Voivodeship (south Poland), the county seat being Bielsko-Biała